Pindi may refer to:
 Rawalpindi, commonly known as Pindi, a city in the Punjab province of Pakistan
 Pindi Bhattian Tehsil, an administrative sub-division of Hafizabad district in the Punjab, Pakistan
 Pindi Bhattian, Pakistan
 Pindi Gheb Tehsil, an administrative subdivision (tehsil), of Attock District in the Punjab, Pakistan
 Pindi Gheb, Pakistan
 Pindi Sarhal, is a village of the Attock District in Punjab, Pakistan
 Pindi Pindi, small rural locality in Mackay Region, Queensland, Australia
 Pindi, Põlva County, Estonia
 Pindi, Võru County, Estonia
 Pindi (Hindu iconography), decked stones or tree stumps viewed in Hinduism as abstract manifestations of the mother goddess Shakti
 Pindi People, african ethnie in DR Congo

See also
 Pindi (disambiguation)
 Pindi Pindi, Queensland, Australia
 Pindus, a butterfly of family Nymphalidae